Partizan Press is a publisher of military history, especially about the English Civil War.  They are the publishing division of Caliver Books — which is based in Leigh-on-Sea and Newthorpe.  They also published Valkyrie Quarterly magazine and distribute miniature figurines for wargaming and role-playing.

References

External links
 History books published by Partizan Press
 Magazines published by Partizan Press

Role-playing game publishing companies